The 2019 Bislett Games was the 54th edition of the annual outdoor track and field meeting in Oslo, Norway. Held on 13 June at Bislett Stadium, it was the fifth leg of the 2019 IAAF Diamond League – the highest level international track and field circuit.  29 events were contested with 13 of them being point-scoring Diamond League disciplines.

Local favorite Karsten Warholm, running in the men's 400 metres hurdles, won in a new European record time of 47.33 seconds, improving on the previous European record of 47.37 seconds that was set by Stéphane Diagana for France in 1995. Warholm had already been the Norwegian record holder with a time 47.64 seconds. He also improved on the meeting record of 47.60 seconds, previously set by Abderrahman Samba for Qatar in the 2018 edition.

In other men's events, Christian Coleman improved on the 100 metres world lead that he shared with fellow American Noah Lyles and Nigeria's Divine Oduduru by 0.01 seconds to 9.85 seconds. A Polish record and world lead was set by Marcin Lewandowski in the mile race, passing Kenyan Vincent Kibet on the home straight to win in 3:52.34, four hundredths ahead of Kibet. Selemon Barega also set a world lead and personal best in the 3000 metres race with a time of 7:32.17 seconds to win ahead of Joshua Cheptegei and Nicholas Kimeli, who finished second and third also with personal bests of 7:33.26 and 7:34.85 respectively. Henrik Ingebrigtsen finished fourth with a Norwegian record with a time of 7:36.85.

Sam Kendricks took his third Diamond League win for the season in the men's pole vault with a mark of 5.91 metres, with world leader Mondo Duplantis settling for fourth behind second place Piotr Lisek and third place Cole Walsh, with all three below Kendricks sharing a final mark of 5.81 metres.

In the women's 3000 metres steeplechase, Norah Jeruto defeated world record holder Beatrice Chepkoech and 2017 world champion Emma Coburn, winning in a world leading and meeting record time of 9:03.71. Chepkoech, who hadn't lost since May 2018, finished second in 9:04.30 with Coburn in fourth behind Hyvin Jepkemoi. Though they did not finish in the top eight, national records were set by Maruša Mišmaš for Slovenia and Anna Emilie Møller for Denmark, with times of 9:20.97 and 9:24.21 respectively.

Two other world leads were set by the women in the high jump and the triple jump. Mariya Lasitskene leaped the first over two meters mark for the 2019 season in the high jump, winning her 20th Diamond League meet in her career at 2.01 metres. Caterine Ibargüen took the world lead in the triple jump with a mark of 14.79 metres.

In her Diamond League debut in the women's 400 metres hurdles, Sydney McLaughlin passed 2016 Olympic champion and world leader Dalilah Muhammad after the final hurdle to win in 54.16 seconds to Muhammad's 54.35 seconds.

Diamond League results
Athletes competing in the Diamond League disciplines earned extra compensation and points which went towards qualifying for one of two Diamond League finals (either Zürich or Brussels depending on the discipline). First place earned eight points, with each step down in place earning one less point than the previous, until no points are awarded in ninth place or lower.

Men

Women

Other international results

Norwegian national results

Men

Women

Mixed

See also
2019 Weltklasse Zürich (first half of the Diamond League final)
2019 Memorial Van Damme (second half of the Diamond League final)

References

Results
"Results Archive Diamond League Selected Season: 2019". Diamond League (2019-06-30). Retrieved 2021-05-04.

External links
Official Diamond League Bislett Games website

Bislett Games
Bislett Games